Carlos Bradley (born April 27, 1960) is a retired professional American football player who played linebacker for six seasons for the San Diego Chargers and Philadelphia Eagles. Carlos Bradley is currently working as head trainer at the Aquatic & Fitness Center in Bala Cynwyd, Pennsylvania. He is also a fitness consultant, and a health and wellness speaker for corporations. 

He is the executive vice president of International Student Athlete Academy isaasports.com, a 501 (c) 3 organization that has worked with student-athletes for the last 23 years, academically and athletically. They empower them to be well-rounded human beings.
As a member, Carlos is often invited to travel with the NFL Alumni Association around the world entertaining and training troops.

References

1960 births
American football linebackers
San Diego Chargers players
Philadelphia Eagles players
Wake Forest Demon Deacons football players
Living people